Pietro Figlioli (born 29 May 1984) is an Italian water polo player. He competed for Australia at the 2004 and 2008 Olympics and for Italy in 2012 and 2016 and won two medals for Italy. He also won the world title in 2011. In 2012 he received the Gold Collar of Sporting Merit from the Italian Olympic Committee.

Personal life
Figlioli was born in Brazil, but his family moved to Australia when he was three years old. His father José Fiolo is a former Olympic swimmer. Figlioli is married to Laura and has sons Lorenzo and Matteo.

Career
Figlioli started competing with the North Brisbane Polo Bears at Albany Creek, Queensland in Australia. He was part of Australia's Olympic squad for the 2004 and 2008 Summer Olympics. He was the top sprinter at these two  Olympics, with 24 and 21 sprints won, respectively. He was also a member of the Australian squad that finished 10th at the 2007 FINA World Championships in Melbourne and won the bronze medal at the 2007 FINA Water Polo World League in Berlin. Figlioli is regarded as one of the world's fastest water polo swimmers and shooters.

In May 2009, Figlioli signed a deal with Italian club Pro Recco. The deal included becoming an Italian citizen, to comply with the Italian league's rule changes to restrict extra-European players from two to one player per team.  As a result of this, he was able to play for Italy at the 2012 and 2016 Olympics, winning a medal on both occasions. He was the joint top sprinter at the 2012 Olympics, with 19 sprints won.

See also
 Italy men's Olympic water polo team records and statistics
 List of Olympic medalists in water polo (men)
 List of players who have appeared in multiple men's Olympic water polo tournaments
 List of men's Olympic water polo tournament top goalscorers
 List of sportspeople who competed for more than one nation
 List of world champions in men's water polo
 List of World Aquatics Championships medalists in water polo

References

External links

 

1984 births
Living people
Australian people of Italian descent
Water polo players from Rio de Janeiro (city)
Australian male water polo players
Brazilian male water polo players
Italian male water polo players
Water polo drivers
Water polo players at the 2004 Summer Olympics
Water polo players at the 2008 Summer Olympics
Water polo players at the 2012 Summer Olympics
Water polo players at the 2016 Summer Olympics
Water polo players at the 2020 Summer Olympics
Medalists at the 2012 Summer Olympics
Medalists at the 2016 Summer Olympics
Olympic water polo players of Australia
Olympic silver medalists for Italy in water polo
Olympic bronze medalists for Italy in water polo
World Aquatics Championships medalists in water polo
Competitors at the 2018 Mediterranean Games
Mediterranean Games competitors for Italy
Naturalised citizens of Italy
Brazilian emigrants to Australia
Australian emigrants to Italy
Brazilian emigrants to Italy
Brazilian people of Italian descent
Sportsmen from Queensland
Expatriate water polo players